Colonia Baranda  is a village and municipality in Chaco Province in northern Argentina.

This town is notable as the birthplace of humorist Luis Landriscina.

References

Populated places in Chaco Province